Archimedes Group is a Tel Aviv-based private intelligence agency that has operated political campaigns using social media since 2017.

History
Archimedes' chief executive is Elinadav Heymann, former director of the Brussels-based European Friends of Israel lobbying group, a former political adviser in Israel's parliament and an ex-intelligence agent for the Israeli air force. Other senior executive include Yuval Harel,  Flávio Goldberg, Uri Ben Yosef, Ariel Treiger, and Rafi Cesana.

In 2019, it was banned from Facebook for "coordinated inauthentic behavior" after Facebook found fake users in countries in sub-Saharan Africa, Latin America and Southeast Asia. Facebook investigations revealed that Archimedes had spent some $1.1 million on fake ads, paid for in Brazilian reais, Israeli shekels and US dollars. Facebook gave examples of Archimedes Group political interference. The Atlantic Council's Digital Forensic Research Lab said in a report that "The tactics employed by Archimedes Group, a private company, closely resemble the types of information warfare tactics often used by governments, and the Kremlin in particular."

new sources have emerged that Archimedes Group is heavily involved in a Black project called "Project: Sentinel". Which is based on social media gamification by targeting far-right influencer/s on social media.

See also 

 Black Cube
 NSO Group
Psy-Group
 Unit 8200
 Cambridge Analytica
 Internet Research Agency

References 

Private intelligence agencies
Private detectives and investigators
Israeli companies established in 2017
Business intelligence companies
Companies based in Tel Aviv
Business services companies established in 2017